The Western Australian Police Commissioner is the head of the Western Australia Police Force. The rank of Commissioner was formalised in 1887; prior to then the rank of Superintendent was more commonly used.

References

External links 
 WA Police Commissioners

 
Lists of office-holders in Australia
Lists of Australian public servants
Western Australia-related lists
Western Australia